Paul Richards may refer to:

 Paul W. Richards (judge) (1874–1956), Justice of the Iowa Supreme Court
 Paul Richards (baseball) (1908–1986), baseball player, manager, scout and executive
 P. W. Richards (Paul Westmacott Richards, 1908–1995), British botanist
 Paul I. Richards (1923–1978), American physicist and applied mathematician
 Paul Richards (actor) (1924–1974), American actor who starred in the ABC-TV 1963–64 series Breaking Point
 Paul G. Richards (born 1943), American seismologist
 Paul Richards (anthropologist) (born 1945), anthropologist and professor at Wageningen University, The Netherlands
 Paul Richards (artist) (born 1949), British artist
 Paul Richards (athlete) (born 1956), Antigua and Barbuda Olympic sprinter
 Paul W. Richards (born 1964), American astronaut
 Paul Richards (politician), mayor of Lynwood, California in 1986–2003
Paul Richards (bowls) (died 1995), Australian lawn bowler
 Paul Richards (racecar driver), member of the Briggs Cunningham team
 Paul Linford Richards, American physicist and Frank Isakson Prize winner in 2000